Pepsi-Cola was a Spanish professional cycling team that existed for the 1969 season. The team was managed by former professional cyclist Salvador Botella.

The team competed in the 1969 Vuelta a España, where they had two stage wins.

Major wins
1969
 Vuelta a España
Stages 7 & 8, Ramón Sáez
 Klasika Primavera, José Manuel Lasa
 Prueba Villafranca de Ordizia, Miguel María Lasa

References

Defunct cycling teams based in Spain
1969 establishments in Spain
1969 disestablishments in Spain
Cycling teams established in 1969
Cycling teams disestablished in 1969